Renminlu Subdistrict  is a subdistrict situated in Shilong District, Pingdingshan, Henan, China. , it administers Longxiang Residential Community and the following six villages:
Xiazhuang Village
Guanzhuang Village
Nanguzhuang Village
Hezhuang Village
Kangwa Village
Xiangchang Village

See also
List of township-level divisions of Henan

References

Township-level divisions of Henan
Shilong District
Subdistricts of the People's Republic of China